The 1967 America's Cup was held in September 1967 at Newport, Rhode Island. The US defender, Intrepid, skippered by Bus Mosbacher, defeated the Australian challenger, Dame Pattie, skippered by Jock Sturrock, four races to zero.

Intrepid had beaten Columbia and American Eagle to become the defender.

References

 
1967
America's Cup
America's Cup